daemontools is a process supervision toolkit written by Daniel J. Bernstein as an alternative to other system initialization and process supervision tools, such as Init.

Some of the features of daemontools are:

 Easy service installation and removal
 Easy first-time service startup
 Reliable restarts
 Easy, reliable signalling
 Clean process state
 Portability

Similar applications are runit, s6, and daemontools-encore.

References

External links
 Official daemontools website, maintained by the author

Public-domain software with source code
Unix process- and task-management-related software